Charles J. Gidding or Giddings (1853–1943) was a United States Navy sailor and a recipient of the United States military's highest decoration, the Medal of Honor.

Biography
Born in 1853 in Bangor, Maine, Gidding joined the Navy from that state. On that day, while Plymouth was at the Brooklyn Navy Yard, Gidding and another sailor, Landsman William Corey, attempted to rescue a crewmate who had fallen from the ship's rigging into the water. For this action, both men were awarded the Medal of Honor two weeks later, on August 9. Another of Plymouth's crew, Seaman Thomas Kersey, rescued a shipmate from drowning on the same day and also received the medal.

Gidding's official Medal of Honor citation reads:
Serving on board the U.S.S. Plymouth, Gidding showed heroic conduct in trying to save the life of one of the crew of that ship, who had fallen overboard from aloft at the Navy Yard, New York, 26 July 1876.

Gidding died on Nov 28, 1943 and is buried in Grove Hill Cemetery, Waltham, Massachusetts (Section A, Lot 13.35, Grave 1).

See also

 List of Medal of Honor recipients during peacetime

References

External links

1853 births
1943 deaths
People from Bangor, Maine
United States Navy sailors
United States Navy Medal of Honor recipients
Non-combat recipients of the Medal of Honor